Đắk Song is a rural district (huyện) of Đắk Nông province in the Central Highlands region of Vietnam. As of 2003 the district had a population of 41,774. The district covers an area of 808 km². The district capital lies at Đắk Song.

References

Districts of Đắk Nông province